The DC Road Runners Club is a non-profit regional group to promote running in the Washington, DC metropolitan area. It is a member of the Road Runners Club of America.

DCRRC was founded in 1961 by Hugh Jascourt.

DCRRC has 1,500 members principally from Virginia, the District of Columbia and Maryland.  It conducts over 50 races each year, including the Washington Birthday Marathon and the National Capital 20 Miler.  Members accumulate points in a summer Bunion Derby Series and a winter Snowball Series.  Among the more noteworthy races created by the group are:
 Cherry Blossom Ten Mile Run (now conducted by a separate committee)
 DCRRC Track Championships
 24-hour track run (for 15 years)
 Larry Noel Greenbelt 15K (since 1957, changed to 12K in 2009)
 Hugh Jascourt 4 Miler
 Belle Haven Half Marathon

The Club sponsors a number of training programs, including a 10K program for novice runners in the spring, a 10-Mile training program in the summer, and a marathon training program in the summer and fall. The Club sponsors weekly long runs on Saturday morning starting from the Iwo Jima Memorial in Arlington, VA.  These start at 8:00 am and at 7:00 am from Memorial Day until the end of September.  The Club also sponsors weekly track workouts at 7:00 pm on Wednesday evenings at the Washington-Lee High School in Arlington.

Many DCRRC officers have taken prominent roles in the Road Runners Club of America.

External links
Official Website

Running clubs in the United States
Road running in the United States
Running in Washington, D.C.
1961 establishments in Washington, D.C.